William Smith Hanger Baylor (April 7, 1831 – August 30, 1862) was an American lawyer and soldier who served as a colonel in the Confederate States Army during the American Civil War.

Before the war, Baylor commanded a militia company, the West Augusta Guard, which later became Company L of the 5th Virginia Infantry Regiment. In April 1862, he was appointed colonel of the regiment.
Baylor assumed command of the Stonewall Brigade after the death of Brigadier General Charles S. Winder on August 9, 1862, at Cedar Mountain. Before his promotion to brigadier general could be confirmed, Baylor was killed in action on the afternoon of August 30, 1862, at Second Manassas after taking the colors of the 33rd Virginia Infantry and gallantly leading his brigade to the unfinished railroad in a charge against the Union V Corps. General William B. Taliaferro said, "No more exalted recognition of his worth and services can be uttered and no higher tribute can be paid him than to declare that he was worthy of the command of the Stonewall Brigade".

Sources
1. The  National Park Service has established these dates for the battle. The references by Greene, Hennessy, Salmon, and Kennedy (whose works are closely aligned with the NPS) adopt these dates as well. However, all of the other references to this article specify that the action on August 28 was a battle separate from the Second Battle of Bull Run. Some of these authors name the action on August 28 the Battle of Groveton, Brawner's Farm, or Gainesville.

2. Herdegen, pp. 91–92; Hennessy, pp. 173–80; Greene, p. 21; Salmon, p. 147.

3. Salmon, p. 150; Hennessy, pp. 339–57; Greene, pp. 41–43.

4.  Staunton VA Biographies

References
 Dawes, Rufus R. A Full Blown Yankee of the Iron Brigade: Service with the Sixth Wisconsin Volunteers. Lincoln: University of Nebraska Press, 1999. . First published 1890 by E. R. Alderman and Sons.
 Editors of Time-Life Books. Lee Takes Command: From Seven Days to Second Bull Run. Alexandria, VA: Time-Life Books, 1984. .
 Eicher, David J. The Longest Night: A Military History of the Civil War. New York: Simon & Schuster, 2001. .
 Greene, A. Wilson. The Second Battle of Manassas. National Park Service Civil War Series. Fort Washington, PA: U.S. National Park Service and Eastern National, 2006. .
 Harsh, Joseph L. Confederate Tide Rising: Robert E. Lee and the Making of Southern Strategy, 1861–1862. Kent, OH: Kent State University Press, 1998. .
 Hennessy, John J. Return to Bull Run: The Campaign and Battle of Second Manassas. Norman: University of Oklahoma Press, 1993. .
 Herdegen, Lance J. The Men Stood Like Iron: How the Iron Brigade Won Its Name. Bloomington: Indiana University Press, 1997. .
 Kennedy, Frances H., ed. The Civil War Battlefield Guide. 2nd ed. Boston: Houghton Mifflin Co., 1998. .
 Langellier, John. Second Manassas 1862: Robert E. Lee's Greatest Victory. Oxford: Osprey Publishing, 2002. .
 Longstreet, James. From Manassas to Appomattox: Memoirs of the Civil War in America. New York: Da Capo Press, 1992. . First published in 1896 by J. B. Lippincott and Co.

External links

1831 births
1862 deaths
American lawyers
Confederate States Army officers
Confederate States of America military personnel killed in the American Civil War
Stonewall Brigade
Place of birth missing